The Adventures of Peg o' the Ring is a 1916 American drama film serial directed by Francis Ford and Jacques Jaccard. It is now considered to be lost.

Cast
 Grace Cunard as Peg
 Francis Ford as Dr. Lund, Junior
 Mark Fenton as Dr. Lund, Senior (credited as Marc Fenton)
 G. Raymond Nye
 Peter Gerald as Flip the Clown (credited as Pete Gerald)
 Jean Hathaway as Mrs. Lund
 Charles Munn
 Irving Lippner as Marcus, the Hindoo
 Jack Duffy
 John Ford as Lund's Accomplice (credited as Jack Ford)
 Lionel Bradshaw
 Eddie Polo (scenes deleted)
 Ruth Stonehouse (scenes deleted; but stills of her in the film survive)

Chapter titles

 The Leopard's Mark
 A Strange Inheritance
 In The Lion's Den
 The Circus Mongrels
 The House of Mystery
 The Cry For Help or Cry of The Ring
 The Wreck
 Outwitted
 The Leap
 In the Hands of The Enemy
 The Stampede
 On The High Seas
 The Clown Act
 The Will
 Retribution

See also
 List of film serials
 List of film serials by studio
 List of lost films

References

External links

1916 drama films
1916 films
1916 lost films
Silent American drama films
American silent serial films
American black-and-white films
Films directed by Jacques Jaccard
Films directed by Francis Ford
Lost American films
Circus films
Films with screenplays by Grace Cunard
Lost drama films
Universal Pictures film serials
1910s American films